The 1945 Fresno State Bulldogs football team represented Fresno State Normal School—now known as California State University, Fresno—during the 1945 college football season.

Fresno State competed in the California Collegiate Athletic Association (CCAA). However, due to the impact of World War II, the Bulldogs only played one conference game in 1945. There was no conference champion crowned in 1945. Since some colleges were still not playing football in 1945, the Bulldogs played the College of Pacific twice and Cal Poly twice.

The team was led by first-year head coach Alvin Pierson and played home games at Ratcliffe Stadium on the campus of Fresno City College in Fresno, California. They finished the season with a record of four wins, six losses and two ties (4–6–2, 0–1 CCAA). The Bulldogs outscored their opponents 113–92 for the season, including shutting out their opponents five times and being shut out three times.

Schedule

Notes

References

Fresno State
Fresno State Bulldogs football seasons
Fresno State Bulldogs football